The 40th Citra Awards, presented by Indonesian Film Board and Ministry of Education, Culture, Research, and Technology, honored the achievement in Indonesian cinema released from 1 October 2019 to 15 March 2020 screened at the theatres or direct to streaming platforms. The ceremony was held on 5 December 2020 at the Assembly Hall, Jakarta Convention Center, Jakarta, Indonesia, and presented by actors Chicco Jerikho, Laura Basuki, Reza Rahadian and Tissa Biani.

Horror film Impetigore received a record of 17 nominations, besting the previous record of 14 set by Marlina the Murderer in Four Acts in 2018. The film won six awards, including Best Picture. Other winners included Abracadabra with three, The Queen of Black Magic with two, Golden Frames in the Closet, Homecoming, Humba Dreams, Imperfect, Mother Earth, One Day We'll Talk About Today, Prognosis, The Science of Fictions, Susi Susanti: Love All, You and I with one.

Winners and nominees
The nominations were announced on 7 November 2020. Winners are listed first, highlighted in boldface, and indicated with a double dagger (‡).

Films with multiple nominations and awards

References

External links

Citra Awards
2020 film awards
Impact of the COVID-19 pandemic on cinema